The elections in India in 1967 included the 1967 Indian general election and nine state legislative assembly elections.

General election

Legislative Assembly elections

Andhra Pradesh

Assam

Bihar

Delhi

Goa, Daman and Diu

|- align=center
!style="background-color:#E9E9E9" align=center colspan=2|Political Party
!style="background-color:#E9E9E9" |Seats contested
!style="background-color:#E9E9E9" |Seats won
!style="background-color:#E9E9E9" |Number of Votes
!style="background-color:#E9E9E9" |% of Votes
|-
| 
|align="left"|Maharashtrawadi Gomantak Party||26||16||111,110||40.42%
|-
| 
|align="left"|United Goans Party (Sequeira Group)||30||12||104,426||37.98%
|-
| 
|align="left"|Independents||156||2||48,471||17.63%
|-
!colspan=2|Total!!226!!30!!264.007!!100%
|-
|}

Gujarat

Haryana

Himachal Pradesh

Jammu and Kashmir

Kerala

|- style="background-color:#E9E9E9; text-align:center;"
! class="unsortable" |
! Political Party !! Flag !! Seats  Contested !! Won !! Net Change  in seats !! % of  Seats
! Votes !! Vote % !! Change in vote %
|-
| 
| style="text-align:left;" |Bharatiya Jana Sangh
|
| 22 || 0 || NA ||  0  || 55,584 || 0.88 || NA
|- style="background: #90EE90;"
| 
| style="text-align:left;" |Communist Party of India
| 
| 22 || 19 ||  16 || 14.29 || 538,004 || 8.57 ||  0.27
|- style="background: #90EE90;"
| 
| style="text-align:left;" |Communist Party of India (Marxist)
| 
| 59 || 52 ||  12 || 39.10 || 1,476,456 || 23.51 ||  3.64
|-
| 
| style="text-align:left;" |Indian National Congress
| 
| 133 || 9 ||  27 || 6.77 || 2,789,556 || 35.43 ||  1.88
|- 
| 
| style="text-align:left;" |Praja Socialist Party
|
| 7 || 0 || NA || 0 || 13,991 || 0.22 || NA
|- style="background: #90EE90;"
| 
| style="text-align:left;" |Samyukta Socialist Party
|
| 21 || 19 || 6 || 14.29 || 527,662 || 8.4 ||   0.27
|- 
| 
| style="text-align:left;" |Swatantra Party
|
| 6 || 0 || NA || 14.29 || 13,105 || 0.21 ||  NA
|- 
| 
| style="text-align:left;" |Kerala Congress
|
| 61 || 5 ||   1 || 3.76 || 475,172 || 7.57 ||   5.01
|- style="background: #90EE90;"
| 
|
| 15 || 14 ||  8 || 10.53 || 424,159 || 6.75 ||  2.92
|-
| 
|
| 75 || 15 ||  3 || 11.28 || 531,783 || 8.47 ||  5.27
|- class="unsortable" style="background-color:#E9E9E9"
! colspan = 3|
! style="text-align:center;" |Total Seats !! 133 ( 0) !! style="text-align:center;" |Voters !!  8,613,658 !! style="text-align:center;" |Turnout !! colspan = 2|6,518,272 (75.67%)
|}

Madras

Source:

Maharashtra

|- align=center
!style="background-color:#E9E9E9" class="unsortable"|
!style="background-color:#E9E9E9" align=center|Political Party
!style="background-color:#E9E9E9" |No. of candidates
!style="background-color:#E9E9E9" |No. of elected
!style="background-color:#E9E9E9" |Number of Votes
!style="background-color:#E9E9E9" |% of Votes
!style="background-color:#E9E9E9" |Seat change
|-
| 
|align="left"|Indian National Congress||270||203||6,288,564||47.03%|| 12
|-
| 
|align="left"|Peasants and Workers Party of India||58||19||1,043,239||7.80%|| 4
|-
| 
|align="left"|Communist Party of India||41||10||651,077||4.87%|| 4
|-
| 
|align="left"|Praja Socialist Party||66||8||545,935||4.08%|| 1
|-
| 
|align="left"|Republican Party of India||79||5||890,377||6.66%|| 5
|-
| 
|align="left"|Bharatiya Jana Sangh||166||4||1,092,670||8.17%|| 4
|-
| 
|align="left"|Samyukta Socialist Party||48||4||616,466||4.61%|| 4
|-
| 
|align="left"|Communist Party of India (Marxist)||11||1||145,083||1.08%|| 1
|-
| 
|align="left"|Independents||463||16||1,948,223||14.57%|| 1
|-
|-
|
|align="left"|Total||1242||270||13,371,735||
|-
|}

Manipur

Mysore

|- align=center
!style="background-color:#E9E9E9" class="unsortable"|
!style="background-color:#E9E9E9" align=center|Political Party
!style="background-color:#E9E9E9" |Contestants
!style="background-color:#E9E9E9" |Seats won
!style="background-color:#E9E9E9" |Seat change
!style="background-color:#E9E9E9" |Number of votes
!style="background-color:#E9E9E9" |Vote share
!style="background-color:#E9E9E9" |Net change
|- style="background: #90EE90;"
| 
|align="left"|Indian National Congress||216||126|| 12||3,636,374||48.43%|| 1.79
|-
| 
|align="left"|Praja Socialist Party||52||20|| 0 ||666,662||8.88%|| 5.20
|-
| 
|align="left"|Swatantra Party||45||16|| 7||497,055 ||6.62%|| 0.53
|-
| 
|align="left"|Samyukta Socialist Party||17||6||||185,222||2.47%||
|-
| 
|align="left"|Bharatiya Jana Sangh||37||4||||211,966||2.82%||
|-
| 
|align="left"|Independents||||41|| 14||2,129,786||28.36%||N/A
|-
|
|align="left"|Total||||216||||'''||||
|-
|}

Odisha

|- style="background-color:#E9E9E9; text-align:center;"
! class="unsortable" |
! Political Party !! Flag !! Seats  Contested !! Won !! Net Change  in seats !! % of  Seats
! Votes !! Vote % !! Change in vote %
|- style="background: #90EE90;"
| 
| style="text-align:left;" |Indian National Congress
| 
| 140 || 31 ||  51 || 22.14 || 12,35,149 || 30.66 ||  12.62
|-
|
| style="text-align:left;" |Bharatiya Jana Sangh
|
| 19 || 0 || "New" || 0 || 21,788 || 4.07 || "New"
|-
| 
| style="text-align:left;" |Praja Socialist Party
|
| 33 || 21 ||  11 || 7.85 || 4,93,750 || 41.16 ||  10.73
|-
| 
| style="text-align:left;" |Communist Party of India
| 
| 31 || 7 ||  3 || 5 || 2,11,999 || 20.71 ||  6.61
|-
| 
| style="text-align:left;" |Communist Party of India (Marxist)
| 
| 10 || 1 || "New" || 0.71 || 46,597 || 18.16 || "New"
|-
| 
| style="text-align:left;" |Swatantra Party
| 
| 101 || 49 || "New" || 35 || 9,09,421 || 34.78 || "New"
|-
| 
| style="text-align:left;" |JAC
| 
| 47 || 26 || "New" || 18.57 || 5,42,734 || 37.17 || "New"
|-
| 
|
| 21 || 2 || N/A || 1.42 || 5,05,394 || 17.72 || N/A
|- class="unsortable" style="background-color:#E9E9E9"
! colspan = 3|
! style="text-align:center;" |Total Seats !! 140 ( 0) !! style="text-align:center;" |Voters !! 98,73,057 !! style="text-align:center;" |Turnout !! colspan = 2|43,48,838 (44.05%)
|}

PunjabParties in green box formed coalition governmentRajasthan

Tripura

Uttar Pradesh

West Bengal

|- align=center
!style="background-color:#E9E9E9" class="unsortable"|
!style="background-color:#E9E9E9" align=center|Political Party
!style="background-color:#E9E9E9" |No. of candidates
!style="background-color:#E9E9E9" |No. of elected
!style="background-color:#E9E9E9" |Number of Votes
!style="background-color:#E9E9E9" |% of Votes
!style="background-color:#E9E9E9" |Seat change
|-
| 
|align="left"|Indian National Congress||280||127||5,207,930||41.13%|| 30
|-
| 
|align="left"|Communist Party of India (Marxist)||135||43||2,293,026||18.11%|| 43
|-
| 
|align="left"|Bangla Congress||80||34||1,286,028||10.16%|| 34
|-
| 
|align="left"|Communist Party of India||62||16||827,196||6.53%|| 34
|-
| 
|align="left"|All India Forward Bloc||42||13||561,148||4.43%||
|-
|
|align="left"|Samyukta Socialist Party||26||7||269,234||2.13%|| 7
|-
| 
|align="left"|Praja Socialist Party||26||7||238,694||1.88%|| 2
|-
| 
|align="left"|Revolutionary Socialist Party||16||6||238,694||2.14%|| 2
|-
| 
|align="left"|Socialist Unity Centre of India||8||4||238,694||0.72%|| 1
|-
| 
|align="left"|Marxist Forward Bloc||58||1||167,934||1.33%|| 1
|-
| 
|align="left"|Revolutionary Communist Party of India||58||1||167,934||1.33%|| 8
|-
| 
|align="left"|Bharatiya Jana Sangh||58||1||167,934||1.33%|| 1
|-
| 
|align="left"|Swatantra Party||21||1||102,576||0.81%|| 1
|-
| 
|align="left"|Independents||327||31||1,708,011||13.49%|| 20
|-
|
|align="left"|Total||1058||280||12,663,030'''||||
|-
|}

References

External links

 Election Commission of India

1967 elections in India
India
1967 in India
Elections in India by year